Arad (also Romanized as Ārād; also known as Arāth and Behbūdī) is a village in Koleyn Rural District, Fashapuyeh District, Ray County, Tehran Province, Iran. At the 2006 census, its population was 91, in 20 families.

References 

Populated places in Ray County, Iran